Kammata Durga, also spelled as Kammatadurga,(near Hemagudda) is a village in the Koppal taluk of Koppal district in the Indian state of Karnataka. Kammatadurga is located Northeast to District Headquarters Koppal.

Importance
Kammatadurga was the capital of King Kampila, father of Kumara Rama. Kammatadurga is famous for the ancient Kammatadurga fort also called as Kumara Rama Kote located on the hill top.

See also 
 Hemagudda
 Koppal
 Munirabad

References 

Villages in Koppal district